Neopotamia cathemacta is a moth of the family Tortricidae. It is found in Thailand and Sumatra.

References

Moths described in 1983
Olethreutini